Ismail El-Gawsaqi was Alexandria's governor from July 1986 till July 1997.

See also
 Timeline of Alexandria, 1980s-1990s

1929 births
2009 deaths
People from Alexandria